Secret Reports on Nazi Germany: The Frankfurt School Contribution to the War Effort is a book composed of the original Office of Strategic Services reports on Nazi Germany prepared primarily by Franz Neumann, Herbert Marcuse, and Otto Kirchheimer, who had all been part of the original Frankfurt School of critical theory.

Neumann, Marcuse, and Kirchheimer produced the intelligence reports that constitute the volume while working for the European Section of the Research and Analysis Branch of the OSS. The files were declassified between 1975 and 1976. The texts were originally written in English.

Some of the materials produced for the OSS project were used by the scholars elsewhere — for instance, Marcuse's The Social Democratic Party of Germany, Dissolution of the Nazi Party and Its Affiliated Organizations, and Policy Towards the Revival of Old Parties and Establishment of New Parties in Germany appear to have been written for an academic position, and were separately published in Technology, War and Fascism.

Scholars have described the volume as "a highly valuable source for anyone interested in intellectual history, the history of ideas, the history of the Second World War, Nazi Germany or wartime intelligence" that will remain "essential reading material for anyone dealing with the so-called Frankfurt School."

The volume consists of six parts. Part I, entitled "The Analysis of the Enemy," examines antisemitism, Reich politics, and the legacy of Prussian militarism. Part II, 'Patterns of Collapse," consists of five chapters by Neumann and Marcuse (with one by Felix Gilbert), and examines Nazi morale, the possibility of a governmental collapse, the impact of Allied air raids, and attempts on Hitler's life. Part III deals with internal opposition in the Reich. Part IV analyzes a range of political, economic, legal and administrative problems facing the Nazis. Part V, authored primarily by Neumann, looks at the German economy. Part VI examine the crimes of the Nazi regime, the treatment of war criminals, and Nazi ideology. Part VII, by Marcuse, examines communism and German trade unions.

References 

Office of Strategic Services
Non-fiction books
Books about Nazi Germany
Critical theory